Mission Beach USA is a reality television series produced for RTÉ by Rival Media for RTÉ's youth strand TRTÉ which aired on RTÉ Two. It was based on the BBC Switch format of the same name, which aired in 2008. Eight Irish teens head for Fort Lauderdale to train to be US lifeguards. Over the course of 3 weeks they join a group of American Teens who are training to be lifeguards. The course coach is Chris Hoch. A second series was set to begin before the end of 2011 and had 8 new Irish teens.
Season 2 was filmed in July 2011 in Fort Lauderdale, Florida.

The Irish teams are made up of:

As of 2015 there has not been a third series of the show.

The Show
Opening narration: -

"American's toughest lifeguard school has allowed eight Irish teens to join them for one challenging summer, that they will never forget. With just three weeks to qualify it's a grueling course headed by lifeguard veteran and rootless task master Coach Cris. The Irish team will be push to their physical and mental limits. Through the highs and the lows. Will the team pull together, or will they fall apart, and will any of them manage to become an elite lifeguard. Spending three weeks away from home and tasting as much of the Florida lifestyle as possible it's the ultimate summer camp. This is Mission Beach USA."

References

External links

(NOTE: The imdb article is for the UK version of the show.)

2010 Irish television series debuts
2011 Irish television series endings
Irish reality television series
Irish television series based on non-Irish television series
Irish television series based on British television series
RTÉ original programming